The football tournament at the 1965 Southeast Asian Games was held from 15 December to 21 December 1965 in Kuala Lumpur, Malaysia.

Teams

Tournament

Group stage 

As the withdrawal of Singapore after their second match left four teams in the competition, the remaining seven group matches were scratched: Burma, Malaysia, South Vietnam and Thailand all automatically qualified for the semi-finals.

Knockout stage

Semi-finals

Bronze medal match

Gold medal match

Medal winners

Notes

References 
Southeast Asian Peninsular Games 1965 at RSSSF
SEAP Games 1965 at AFF official website

Southeast
Football at the Southeast Asian Games
1965
1965 in Malaysian sport
Events at the 1965 Southeast Asian Peninsular Games